Commerce Township, officially the Charter Township of Commerce, is a charter township of Oakland County in the U.S. state of Michigan. The population was 40,186 at the 2010 census.

The cities of Walled Lake and Wixom border to the south, and the township contains the village of Wolverine Lake. Originally settled as a resort destination, the township has seen a large population increase of permanent residents due to the townships rural environment and recreation areas, including most of Proud Lake State Recreation Area. The Huron River runs mostly north–south through the township, and the township also contains numerous lakes.

The northern terminus of M-5 is within Commerce Township.  This highway was originally meant to connect the spur route Interstate 275 back to Interstate 75, but the project was canceled due to the difficulty of construction around the township's numerous lakes, as well as the high property value of the area.

Communities
Commerce is located at Commerce and Sleeth Roads (Elevation: 945 ft./288 m.).  It was platted in 1836.
Glengary is located on Benstein Road between Oakley Park and Glengary Roads (Elevation: 922 ft./281 m.).
Oakley Park is located on (Elevation: 932 ft./284 m.).
Union Lake is an unincorporated community joined in the northeastern part of the township joining the townships of West Bloomfield, Waterford, and White Lake.
Wolverine Lake is an incorporated village in the township.

Geography

Demographics

As of the census of 2000, there were 34,764 people, 12,379 households, and 9,754 families residing in the township. The racial makeup of the township was 96.73% White, 0.50% African American, 0.19% Native American, 1.31% Asian, 0.01% Pacific Islander, 0.32% from other races, and 0.95% from two or more races. Hispanic or Latino of any race were 1.16% of the population.

There were 12,379 households, out of which 42.4% had children under the age of 18 living with them, 68.4% were married couples living together, 7.3% had a female householder with no husband present, and 21.2% were non-families. 17.0% of all households were made up of individuals, and 4.3% had someone living alone who was 65 years of age or older. The average household size was 2.81 and the average family size was 3.19.

In the township the population was spread out, with 29.5% under the age of 18, 5.6% from 18 to 24, 34.1% from 25 to 44, 23.7% from 45 to 64, and 7.1% who were 65 years of age or older.  The median age was 36 years. For every 100 females, there were 101.4 males.  For every 100 females age 18 and over, there were 99.0 males.

The median income for a household in the township was $72,702, and the median income for a family was $79,976. Males had a median income of $61,087 versus $36,125 for females. The per capita income for the township was $33,104.  About 2.4% of families and 3.4% of the population were below the poverty line, including 3.8% of those under age 18 and 4.4% of those age 65 or over.

Education
The two school districts within the boundaries of Commerce Township are Walled Lake Consolidated Schools and Huron Valley Schools.
 Walled Lake Northern, Walled Lake Central and Walled Lake Western High Schools are all located within the township.

Catholic schools are under the Roman Catholic Archdiocese of Detroit. St. William Catholic Church, which includes a portion of Commerce Township in its service area, operates St. William Catholic School, a K-8 school in Walled Lake.

Religion
St. William Church in Walled Lake includes a portion of Commerce Township in its service area.

Notable people
David Hahn, a 17-year-old Eagle Scout, constructed a makeshift nuclear reactor in his backyard in Commerce Township, exposing himself and his neighbors—and maybe even as many as 40,000 people in the area—to radioactive materials, and drawing the attention of the EPA.  The event became a short-lived media sensation, and a book by Ken Silverstein called The Radioactive Boy Scout was written about the incident and published in 2004.
Connor Hellebuyck, ice hockey goaltender
Alina Morse, Inventor, entrepreneur, CEO and founder of Zollicandy
William John McConnell was born in Commerce Township. Mr. McConnell later became one of the first Senators of Idaho and its third Governor.

References

Notes

Sources

External links

Charter Township of Commerce

 
Townships in Oakland County, Michigan
Charter townships in Michigan
Metro Detroit